Silent Mouse is a British 1988 television film directed and produced by Robin Crichton.

Plot 
In 1818, Oberndorf bei Salzburg, Austria, the church organ fails on Christmas Eve. The assistant priest Joseph Mohr and the church organist Franz Gruber writes the Christmas carol "Silent Night" which they and the church choir later perform at church accompanied by Mohr playing the guitar.

Cast 
 Richard Blane - Felix Gruber
 John Cairney - Father Ambrosius
 Gregor Fisher - Franz Gruber
 Phil McCall - Patter Nostler
 Bill McCue - Karl Maraycher
 Jack McKenzie - Joseph Mohr
 John Moore - King's Choirmaster
 Lynn Redgrave - Narrator
 Mary Riggans - Felix Gruber (voice)
 Zdenka Sajfertová - Mrs. Gruber

Production 
The film was produced by Edinburgh Film and Video productions for Channel 4 in association with PBS and Czechoslovak Television. It was filmed in Austria and Slovakia.

Release 
The film premiered on 25 December 1988 in the United Kingdom and in 1990 in the USA.

See also 
 The Legend of Silent Night (1968)
 Silent Night, Holy Night (1976)

References

External links 
 

1988 films
1988 television films
British television films
Films set in Austria
Films set in 1818
British Christmas films
Christmas television films
1980s English-language films